Run, Psycho, Run (/ translation: Later, Claire....Later) is a 1968 film directed by Brunello Rondi. The film stars Gary Merrill, Elga Andersen and Georges Rivière. Although filmed in the mid 1960s, Run, Psycho, Run was not released until 1968 in Italy. It subsequently was released directed to television in the United States.

Plot
The film is set in Tuscany in 1912 where retired Judge George Dennison, his wife Claire, and their son Robert arrive at a Villa in Mount Argentario for the summer. Shortly after a party, Claire and Robert are both murdered. A year later, Judge Dennison once again returns to the villa with his new fiancée Ann and her son. Ann resembles Claire which he believe will assist him in his scheme to discover the murderer's identity.

Cast

Production
By the late 1950s, director Brunello Rondi was considered a respected and well-known intellectual in Italy. After the lack of financial success of his previous film, Il demonio, Rondi explained in an interview in with Dario Argento in 1965 that his next film Run, Psycho, Run, that he had "no intention of making a mystery, or a horror film, or even a suspense yarn, Hitchcock-style. What really interests me is to grasp with a film set in 1912 the origins of today’s disease within the bourgeoisie, and to portray its degeneration with extreme violence. I read very few crime novels in my life. And I must say that I do not even like them very much. In my film there is indeed a crime, and an investigation. But it’s only a pretext, in a story full of hatred set in the last years of the "Belle Époque," when some kind of false euphoria was decomposing, while one could glimpse the first signs of the impending war, the signs of hatred and the strengthening of class struggle."

The film was shot at Castello della Castelluccia in Rome and at the Argentario in Tuscany. Italian film historian Roberto Curti suggested that the film may have been a troubled production, noting the lack of an editor in the credits and that film had a sudden pessimistic ending.

Release
The film was not released for several years after its initial film production, and released in Italy in July 1968 where it was distributed by Bianco Nero Film. The film was released directly to television as Run, Psycho, Run through American International Television (AIP-TV). The dubbing cast included Carolyn De Fonseca and John Karlsen and Gary Merrill dubbing his own voice. Run, Psycho, Run was first shown in the United States on November 2, 1969, on Sacramento's KCRA-Channel 3 as part of his Seven Arts Theater show.

As of 2015, the film has never been released on home video.

Footnotes

References

External links
 

Italian mystery thriller films
French mystery thriller films
Films shot in Rome
Films shot in Tuscany
Films scored by Giovanni Fusco
1960s Italian films
1960s French films